This page details football records in Japan. Unless otherwise stated, records are taken from the J.League.

J.League records (split-season era)

Most Titles
4, Kashima Antlers (1996, 1998, 2000, 2001)

Most Consecutive Titles
2, Joint record: Verdy Kawasaki- (1993–1994), Kashima Antlers (2000, 2001), Yokohama F. Marinos (2003, 2004)

J.League Division 1 Records (single-season era)

Most Titles
3, Kashima Antlers (2007, 2008, 2009)

Most Consecutive Titles
3, Kashima Antlers (2007–2009)

Most Second Place Finishes
3, Kawasaki Frontale (2006, 2008, 2009)

References

Football records and statistics in Japan
Football in Japan
Japan